J-Popcon is the oldest and largest convention in Denmark with focus on anime, manga, cosplay and other aspects of the Japanese popular culture. It is held in Copenhagen, and hosts the Danish qualification round for the World Cosplay Summit in Nagoya, Japan, one of the Danish qualification rounds for EuroCos in London, England, and the Danish qualification round for ECG in Paris, France.

History

References

External links 

 

Anime conventions
Recurring events established in 2000
2000 establishments in Denmark